One star may refer to:

 One-star rank, a senior military rank
 Star (classification), a grading of, for example, a hotel, restaurant, movie, TV show or theatre or musical work or performance
 One Star (record label), producers of Haciendo El Amor Con La Ropa
 One Star Hotel, a Philadelphia-based rock band
 One Star Story (band), Missouri powerpop band
 Baire one star function, in mathematical real analysis

See also
 Star (classification)
 Lone Star (disambiguation)
 OnStar
 STAR 1 (disambiguation)
 Istar (disambiguation)

 For other numbers of stars, see :Category:Star ranking systems